Spectrum Sports (abbreviated as SPECTSN), also known under the corporate names Spectrum Networks,  or Charter Sports Regional Networks, is the collective name for a group of regional sports networks in the United States that are primarily owned and operated by Charter Communications through its acquisition of Time Warner Cable in May 2016. Charter also operates two other channels under the alternative name Spectrum SportsNet. The channels previously were branded as either Time Warner Cable Sports Channel or Time Warner Cable SportsNet.

Each of the networks carry regional broadcasts of sporting events from various professional, collegiate and high school sports teams (with broadcasts typically exclusive to each individual network, although some are shown on more than one Spectrum Sports network within a particular team's designated market area), along with regional and national sports discussion, documentary and analysis programs.

Depending on their individual team rights, some Spectrum Sports outlets maintain overflow feeds available via digital cable channels in their home markets, which may provide alternate programming when not used to carry game broadcasts that the main feed cannot carry due to scheduling conflicts. Spectrum Sports' business operations are based in New York City, New York and Los Angeles, California.

History
Time Warner Cable (TWC) launched its first regional sports network in Kansas City in 1996. The network then known as Metro Sports featured mostly college and high school games. The second of these networks was formed in 1998 as Central Ohio Sport! Television. That network began as a partnership with Insight Communications which Time Warner would later acquire. Other networks would soon follow under various names. It wasn't until Fall 2013 that TWC decided to unify these channels under one brand, Time Warner Cable Sports Channel. All of these channels were rebranded as Spectrum Sports after TWC was acquired by Charter in 2016. At that time, Bright House Sports Network was also rebranded Spectrum Sports Florida as Charter had acquired Bright House Networks in the same deal as TWC. With the exception of the Kansas City network (which is also carried by Comcast), all of these networks have exclusive carriage on Charter Spectrum systems only.

Time Warner Cable has also partnered with major league sports teams to form regional sports networks. The first of these was SportsNet New York in 2006 of which the New York Mets are the majority owners. In 2012, Time Warner Cable SportsNet (currently Spectrum SportsNet) was formed in a partnership with the Los Angeles Lakers. This was followed by the less successful Time Warner SportsNet LA (currently Spectrum SportsNet LA) as joint-venture with the Los Angeles Dodgers.

Since taking over, Charter has shut down most of these networks. In some cases they have been replaced by Spectrum News.

Networks

Owned and operated

Partnerships

Former networks

See also
 NBC Sports Regional Networks
 Fox Sports Networks
 Spectrum News

References

External links

 Official Website

 
Sports television networks in the United States
Television channels and stations established in 2003
2003 establishments in the United States